Manandriana District is a district in central Madagascar. It is part of Amoron'i Mania Region. It covers an area of 981.98 sq.km, and had a population of 95,594 in 2013. Its capital is Ambovombe Afovoany.

Communes
The district is further divided into ten communes:

 Ambatomarina
 Ambohimahazo
 Ambohimilanja
 Ambohipo
 Ambovombe Afovoany
 Andakatanikely
 Andakatany
 Anjoma Nandihizana
 Anjoman'ankona
 Talata Vohimena

References

Districts of Amoron'i Mania